Sedgemoor services is a motorway service station on the M5 motorway near the village of Rooks Bridge in Somerset, England. The location of the services can be identified from a long distance because of their proximity to Brent Knoll, an isolated hill on the Somerset Levels. 

The northbound station is operated by Welcome Break, and the southbound station is operated by Roadchef.

The northbound station is one of fourteen service stations for which large murals were commissioned from artist David Fisher in the 1990s, designed to reflect the local area and history.

History
The sites opened in 1970 as Brent Knoll Rest Area by the Department for Transport; however, after high rates of crime, the services were transferred to Welcome Break and Roadchef. They were upgraded to Motorway Service Area status in 1987 after two service buildings were added.

References

External links
Motorway Services Online - Sedgemoor northbound
Motorway Services Online - Sedgemoor southbound
Motorway Services Trivia - Sedgemoor

M5 motorway service stations
RoadChef motorway service stations
Welcome Break motorway service stations
Transport in Somerset
Buildings and structures in Sedgemoor